Garth Brooks in...the Life of Chris Gaines, also titled Greatest Hits, is an album by American country music artist Garth Brooks, in which Brooks assumes the fictitious persona of Australian rock artist Chris Gaines. Originally, this album was intended to be the soundtrack for a movie called The Lamb that would star Brooks as a rock star recalling the different periods of his life. This album was purposely released a year in advance from the scheduled film release date to pique interest in Brooks performing rock instead of country. The Lamb, however, was never filmed due to financial and management problems.

The album was released on September 28, 1999. It reached No. 2 on the Billboard 200 chart behind Creed's Human Clay, and also gained Brooks his first and to date only appearance in the top 40 of the US Billboard Hot 100, with "Lost in You", which peaked at No. 5. The track "It Don't Matter to the Sun" was later covered in 2005, by Rosie Thomas on her If Songs Could Be Held album, and later as a duet between Don Henley and Stevie Nicks on the Target edition of Henley's 2015 album Cass County. The track "Right Now" samples the chorus of The Youngbloods' 1969 hit "Get Together", while the track "Maybe" was previously recorded by Alison Krauss on her 1999 album Forget About It.

On November 13, 1999, Brooks hosted Saturday Night Live as himself but performed the musical number ("Way of the Girl") as Chris Gaines without acknowledging to the audience that they were the same person. The album had disappointing sales compared to Brooks' previous albums, with some citing Brooks' image change of wig and make up, and the album's rock-star concept for this fact.

Track listing

Personnel 
 Garth Brooks (as Chris Gaines) – lead vocals, acoustic guitar
 Wayne Kirkpatrick – keyboards, clavinet, acoustic guitar, drum programming, backing vocals
 Tommy Sims – keyboards, acoustic guitar, drum programming, backing vocals
 Blair Masters – keyboards (1, 3, 5, 6, 11)
 Mike Lawler – keyboards (3), clavinet (3)
 Greg Phillinganes – keyboards (3)
 Matt Rollings – keyboards (4)
 Rami Jaffee – Hammond B3 organ (9)
 Phil Madeira – Hammond B3 organ (10, 12), horn and string arrangements (12)
 Gordon Kennedy – acoustic guitar, electric guitars, bass, backing vocals, lead vocals (13)
 Reggie Young – electric guitar (4)
 Jimmie Lee Sloas – bass (5, 6, 8)
 James "Hutch" Hutchison – bass (9)
 Dan Needham – drums (1)
 Chris McHugh – drums, percussion, drum programming 
 Eddie Bayers – drums (4)
 Kenny Aronoff – drums (9)
 Lenny Castro – percussion (3)
 Terry McMillan – percussion (12)
 Carl Marsh – horn and string arrangements (12), Fairlight horns (13)
 Carl Gorodetzky – string contractor (12)
 The Nashville String Machine – horns and strings (12)
 Lee Leavitt – vocal whispers (8)
 Crystal Taliefero – backing vocals (9)
 Kelly Shane – stock market reporter (11)
 Chris Harris – chanting (12)
 Mark Heimermann – chanting (12)

Production 
 Don Was – producer 
 J.B. Baird – recording and mixing
 George Massenburg – recording and mixing (horns and strings)
 Glenn Spinner – recording and mixing
 Rik Pekkonen – recording

Charts
Garth Brooks in... The Life of Chris Gaines peaked at No. 2 on the U.S. Billboard 200, and peaked at No. 5 on the Canadian Albums Chart. In November 1999, it was Certified 2 x Platinum by the RIAA.

Weekly charts

Year-end charts

Singles

Sales and certifications

References

External links
Official Chris Gaines Myspace

1999 albums
Albums produced by Don Was
Garth Brooks albums
Capitol Records albums
Works published under a pseudonym